The IKCO Samand is an Iranian sedan produced by IKCO. The Samand production project began in 2001 and the first car was sold in 2001. The Samand inherits the mantle of Iran's national automobile from the Paykan, which was sold by Iran Khodro from 1967 to 2005.

Engine and components
The Iranian-designed Samand uses the Peugeot 405 platform, equipped with either IKCO-designed EF7 engines or PSA XU7JP/L3 engines, amongst others. IKCO manufactures 80% of Samand's parts domestically, including its Iranian-designed engine.

For export markets (and also the Iranian market), IKCO uses the Peugeot TU5JP4 engine. This is because the TU5 is a low-consumption and powerful engine, and because of the ease of finding its parts all over Europe, since the TU5 has been used for the Peugeot 206, Peugeot 307 and Peugeot 207.
The TU5 version of Samand comes with three new options: driver airbag, pre-tensioner seatbelts, headlight height adjuster and active antenna.

Since early 2009, IKCO has used newly developed Iranian engines such as a dual-fuel national engine for its new models (EF7).
In mid-2010, IKCO started to install petrol-only EF7 engines on Samand. The engine is not a petrol-based version of EF7 but the compressed natural gas (CNG) parts of the engine are removed and also the engine control unit (ECU) programme. However, the petrol-based version of the engine is currently under development.

Performance

 Fuel Consumption ( City / Combined / Highway (90 km/h) Constant )
 CNG Fuel Consumption numbers are measured in Kg

Diesel Samand

In 2009, IKCO announced that they will produce Samand with their new engine EFD in 2010; however, due to the required tests for the engine, readying the car for installing the engine on it and also lack of distribution the Euro IV diesel fuel in the country postponed the production time to 2011.
On November 30, 2010 IKCO announced the major changes made in Samand compared to dual-fuel or single fuel Samands for making it compatible for installing the EFD engine on.
This main changes are: changing the radiator, installing the intercooler, water and hydraulic hoses, engine housings, exhaust system gearbox and the engine compartment insulations.

Exports

Samand cars are exported to the following countries:

Africa
 Algeria
 Egypt
 Ghana
 Mali
 Senegal

Asia
 Afghanistan
 Bangladesh
 Syria
 Tajikistan
 Vietnam
 Iraq
 Lebanon

Europe
 Belarus
 Russia
 Switzerland
 Turkey
 Armenia
 Azerbaijan
 Georgia

South America
 Venezuela

Production facilities

Samand has been also manufactured in Minsk, Belarus, by the Unison firm alongside Lublin vans since September 2006. The Export Development Bank of Iran will finance the implementation of the project with a $36 million budget. By 2010, the plant's annual production capacity will reach 120,000 vehicles.

Star company assembles Samand sedan in Azerbaijan under the local name AzSamand Aziz.

Venirauto company started assembling Samand sedan (badged Centauro) in Venezuela from 2006.

Siamco launched in March 2007 the assembly line of Samand (Siamco Sham) in Syria.

Iran Khodro (IKCO) also plans to assemble the Samand in Egypt in joint ventures in the future.

See also
 List of Iranian cars

References

External links

Official website of Iran Khodro
IRNA news report about Samand assembly in Belarus
News report about the Samand's dual fuel engine

Front-wheel-drive vehicles
Mid-size cars
Sedans
Cars introduced in 2003
Samand
Cars of Iran
Police vehicles